Margaret Cookhorn is a British classical contrabassoonist and bassoonist. She is Principal Contrabassoon and Bassoon with the City of Birmingham Symphony Orchestra, bassoonist with the Birmingham Contemporary Music Group
and, notably, has pursued a career as a contrabassoon soloist. John Woolrich's contrabassoon concerto Falling Down was written for her. She most recently performed the piece at the BBC Proms in 2015.

Cookhorn is a tutor at the Royal Birmingham Conservatoire and for the CBSO Youth Orchestra.

References

External links
 
 

Living people
Year of birth missing (living people)
English classical bassoonists
Alumni of the Royal Northern College of Music